District 2 is a district on the western side of Lake Zürich in the Swiss city of Zürich.

The district comprises the quarters Wollishofen, Leimbach and Enge.

References

2